Ian or Iain MacLean or McLean may refer to:

Sportsmen
Ian McLean (footballer) (1929–1965), Australian rules footballer
Ian McLean (cricketer) (born 1954), Australian cricketer
Iain MacLean (basketball) (born 1965), Scottish former basketball player and coach
Ian MacLean (born 1966), Scottish former footballer
Iain McLean (born 1983), Scottish lawn bowler

Others
Ian McLean (politician) (born 1934), New Zealand National Party MP
Iain MacLean (politician) (1953–2008), Australian Liberal Party legislator
Iain MacLean (journalist), Scottish TV news presenter since 2001